Proline rich 35 is a protein that in humans is encoded by the PRR35 gene.

References

Further reading 

Genes
Human proteins